Stefan Edberg defeated Michael Stich in the final, 5–7, 6–4, 6–1 to win the singles tennis title at the 1992 ATP German Open.

Karel Nováček was the defending champion, but was defeated by Boris Becker in the quarterfinals.

Seeds
A champion seed is indicated in bold text while text in italics indicates the round in which that seed was eliminated.

  Stefan Edberg (champion)
  Boris Becker (semifinals)
  Michael Stich (final)
  Michael Chang (third round)
  Goran Ivanišević (third round)
  Petr Korda (second round)
  Ivan Lendl (second round)
  Karel Nováček (quarterfinals)
  Emilio Sánchez (first round)
  Alberto Mancini (first round)
  Andre Agassi (second round)
  Richard Krajicek (quarterfinals)
  Alexander Volkov (first round)
  Thomas Muster (second round)
  Wayne Ferreira (second round)
  Francisco Clavet (third round)

Draw

Finals

Top half

Section 1

Section 2

Bottom half

Section 3

Section 4

External links
 1992 ATP German Open draw

Singles